7152 Euneus  is a Jupiter trojan from the Greek camp, approximately  in diameter. It was discovered during the second Palomar–Leiden Trojan survey in 1973, and later named after Euneus from Greek mythology. The dark Jovian asteroid has a rotation period of 9.7 hours and is likely spherical in shape.

Discovery 

Euneus was discovered on 19 September 1973, by Dutch astronomers Ingrid and Cornelis van Houten at Leiden, on photographic plates taken by Tom Gehrels at the Palomar Observatory in California. The body's observation arc begins with its official discovery observation.

Palomar–Leiden Trojan survey 

While the discovery date aligns with the second Palomar–Leiden Trojan survey, Euneus has not received a  prefixed survey designation, which was assigned to the discoveries made by the fruitful collaboration between the Palomar and Leiden observatories in the 1960s and 1970s. Gehrels used Palomar's Samuel Oschin telescope (also known as the 48-inch Schmidt Telescope), and shipped the photographic plates to Ingrid and Cornelis van Houten at Leiden Observatory where astrometry was carried out. The trio are credited with the discovery of several thousand asteroids.

Naming 

This minor planet was named after Euneus, son of Jason and Hypsipyle. He was the king of Lemnos and reprovisioned the Greek fleet with wine during the Trojan War. The official naming citation was published by the Minor Planet Center on 18 August 1997.

Orbit and classification 

Euneus is a dark Jupiter trojan in a 1:1 orbital resonance with Jupiter. It is located in the leading Greek camp at the Gas Giant's  Lagrangian point, 60° ahead of its orbit . It is also a non-family asteroid in the Jovian background population. It orbits the Sun at a distance of 4.8–5.5 AU once every 11 years and 9 months (4,276 days; semi-major axis of 5.16 AU). Its orbit has an eccentricity of 0.06 and an inclination of 4° with respect to the ecliptic.

Physical characteristics 

Euneus is an assumed, carbonaceous C-type asteroid. Most Jupiter trojans are D-types, with the remainder being mostly C and P-type asteroids. It has a typical V–I color index of 0.91 and a BR color of 1.24 (also see table below).

Rotation period 

In January 2013, Robert Stephens at the Center for Solar System Studies attempted to obtain a rotational lightcurve of Euneus from photometric observations. However, during three consecutive nights of observations, no rotation period could be determined as the lightcurve's brightness did not vary by more than 0.01 magnitude.

In April 2015, follow-up observations by Stephens gave a period of  hours, still with a low brightness amplitude of 0.09 magnitude, indicating that the body is likely of spherical shape. Stephens also reanalyzed his data from 2013 using the newly obtained period which still resulted in an essentially flat lightcurve. He concluded that the body was possibly observed near pole-on during the 2013-opposition.

Diameter and albedo 

According to the survey carried out by the NEOWISE mission of NASA's Wide-field Infrared Survey Explorer, Euneus measures 39.77 kilometers in diameter and its surface has an albedo of 0.093, while the Collaborative Asteroid Lightcurve Link assumes a standard albedo for a carbonaceous asteroid of 0.057 and calculates a diameter of 48.48 kilometers based on an absolute magnitude of 10.3.

Notes

References

External links 
 Asteroid Lightcurve Database (LCDB), query form (info )
 Dictionary of Minor Planet Names, Google books
 Discovery Circumstances: Numbered Minor Planets (5001)-(10000) – Minor Planet Center
 Asteroid 7152 Euneus at the Small Bodies Data Ferret
 
 

007152
Discoveries by Cornelis Johannes van Houten
Discoveries by Ingrid van Houten-Groeneveld
Discoveries by Tom Gehrels
Named minor planets
19730919